Latheticomyia is a genus of flies in the family Pseudopomyzidae.

Species
Latheticomyia infumata Wheeler, 1956
Latheticomyia lineata Wheeler, 1956
Latheticomyia longiterebra Hennig, 1969
Latheticomyia peruana Marques & Rafael, 2016
Latheticomyia rotundicornis Hennig, 1969
Latheticomyia tricolor Wheeler, 1956
Latheticomyia xantha Marques & Rafael, 2016

References

Pseudopomyzidae
Brachycera genera
Taxa named by William Morton Wheeler
Diptera of North America
Diptera of South America